Urodeta noreikai is a moth of the family Elachistidae. It is found in the Nepalese Himalayas.

References

Elachistidae
Moths described in 2013
Moths of Asia